French may refer to:

 Something of, from, or related to France
 French language, which originated in France
 French people, a nation and ethnic group
 French cuisine, cooking traditions and practices

Arts and media
 The French (band), a British rock band
 "French" (episode), a live-action episode of The Super Mario Bros. Super Show!
 Française (film), a 2008 film
 French Stewart (born 1964), American actor

Other uses
 French (surname), a surname (including a list of people with the name)
 French (tunic),  a type of military jacket or tunic
 French's, an American brand of mustard condiment
 French (catheter scale), a unit of measurement
 French Defence, a chess opening
 French kiss, a type of kiss

See also
 France (disambiguation)
 Franch, a surname
 French Revolution (disambiguation)
 French River (disambiguation), several rivers and other places
 Frenching (disambiguation)
 Justice French (disambiguation)
 
 

Language and nationality disambiguation pages